South Dakota Highway 21 (SD 21) is a  state highway in south-central Hamlin Countym South Dakota, that connects Lake Norden and Hayti.

SD 21 originally extended from the Nebraska state line to the North Dakota state line, completely concurrent with U.S. Route 81 (US 81). By the mid-1930s, only the current part of the highway remained.

Route description
SD 21 begins at an intersection with SD 28 just northwest of the main part of Lake Norden. It travels to the north. Almost immediately, it crosses over Dolph Creek. It travels just west of Lake Norden. North of 192nd Street, it curves to the east. Approximately  later, the highway curves to the north-northeast. Just south of 190th Street, it curves back to the north. Just south of 189th Street, it begins to parallel the eastern part of Lake Marsh. It then enters the southwestern part of Hayti. In the west-central part of the town, it turns right onto Main Avenue and heads to the east. Between 2nd and 3rd streets, it passes a U.S. post office and the Hayti Fire Hall. At an intersection with 4th Street, SD 21 turns left and heads north again. At this intersection is the Hamlin County Courthouse. At an intersection with Redbird Avenue, it turns right and heads to the east. East of 7th Street, it leaves Hayti and continues to the east until it reaches its eastern terminus, an intersection with US 81. Here, the roadway continues as 188th Street.

National Highway System
No part of SD 21 is included as part of the National Highway System, a system of routes determined to be the most important for the nation's economy, mobility and defense.

History

When SD 21 was established in 1926, it was completely concurrent with US 81, which was also established at this time. This concurrency extended from the Nebraska state line to the North Dakota state line. By 1935, all of SD 21 was decommissioned except for its current alignment.

Major intersections

See also

 List of state highways in South Dakota

References

External links

 The Unofficial South Dakota Highways Page: Highways 1-30

0021
Transportation in Hamlin County, South Dakota